Alexander Winkler may refer to:

 Alexander Winkler (footballer) (born 1992), German footballer
 Alexander Winkler (composer) (1865–1935), Russian pianist, composer and music educator